Lawrence Ethan Albright (born May 1, 1971) is a former American football long snapper who played in the National Football League (NFL) for 16 seasons, primarily with the Washington Redskins. From 1995 to 2010, he was a member of the Redskins for nine seasons, the Buffalo Bills for five seasons, and the Miami Dolphins and San Diego Chargers for one season each. Nicknamed The Red Snapper due to his position and his red hair, Albright played college football at North Carolina.

Early years
Albright attended Grimsley High School in Greensboro, North Carolina (1989), and was a standout in football, basketball, and baseball.

College career
Albright played tight end early in his career for the North Carolina Tar Heels but later switched to offensive tackle and was named First-team All-ACC at that position in 1993.  Albright also handled the long snapping duties for the Tar Heels.

Professional career

Miami Dolphins
Albright began as an undrafted free agent, but later signed with the Miami Dolphins, playing 10 games during the 1995 season.

Buffalo Bills

Albright signed for the Buffalo Bills in 1996. He played 16 games in every season between 1996 and 2000.

Washington Redskins
In 2001, he signed with the Redskins. On March 3, 2005, he was re-signed by the team.

Albright was named to the Pro Bowl following the 2007 season. He wore the number 21, along with teammates Chris Cooley and Chris Samuels, in honor of their teammate Sean Taylor, who was killed during the 2007 season. Albright was re-signed by the Redskins, keeping him away from the free agent market, on February 19, 2008.

On February 13, 2009, Albright re-signed with the Washington Redskins.

On September 28, 2010, Albright signed with the San Diego Chargers. He was released two weeks later on October 13.

Following his retirement from the league, Albright set the record for the most consecutive starts by a long snapper at 230 and the most consecutive regular season starts at 224, the latter of which has been tied by John Denney.

In popular culture
In 2006,  Albright became an internet meme for being the lowest-rated NFL player in the video game Madden NFL 07 at 53 out of 99. The low rating was made popular by the now-defunct website Phat Phree and gained further traction after Albright received Pro Bowl honors the following year.

Personal life
Albright and his wife, Katherine, have two daughters and two sons: Mary Grace, Madelyn Costner, Lawson Geoffrey and Nolan Davis; they reside in his hometown of Greensboro, North Carolina. He is currently the athletic director at Grimsley High School, his alma mater.

See also
 List of most consecutive games played

References

External links
 
 Washington Redskins bio

1971 births
Living people
Players of American football from Greensboro, North Carolina
American football offensive tackles
American football centers
American football long snappers
National Conference Pro Bowl players
North Carolina Tar Heels football players
Miami Dolphins players
Green Bay Packers players
Buffalo Bills players
Washington Redskins players
San Diego Chargers players
Grimsley High School alumni